Associazione Sportiva Dilettantistica AVC Vogherese 1919 (briefly Vogherese or Voghera) is an Italian football club, based in the town Voghera, Lombardy. It plays at Voghera's Stadio Comunale Giovanni Parisi, with a capacity of 4,000 seats.

Foundation 

Associazione Vogherese Calcio was founded on 26 November 1919 at the Trattoria Pistone.

After a dozen championships between second and first division, in 1930 Vogherese lost the playoff for promotion to Serie B in Piacenza for three goals to two.

In 1932, the Italy national team played a winning friendly in Voghera, by six to two.

In the late 1930s until 1942 the Vogherese were called V.I.S.A. Voghera, only to return to A.V.C. Vogherese in championship 1942–43.

Between 1945 and 1948 was the peak for football in Voghera with three consecutive seasons in Serie B. Then the relegation to Serie C in the 1950s, in 1959 the company experienced a severe financial crisis that led to the cessation of sport.

Refoundation 
To continue the football tradition of A.C. Voghera, the Associazione Ragazzi Cairoli, founded in 1948 took the place of Vogherese, recovering only in 1994 the name of the bankrupt company, competing in amateur tournaments Lombard until its return to Serie D.

At the end of the 1980–81 season it was promoted to the Serie C2, remaining until the 1987–88 season.

Demoted in Serie D, it would still play between this league and Serie C2: it was relegated from C2 at the end of the 1998–99 season.

In 2005 the team after finishing the season in third place, won the playoffs, but this was not enough to get the repechage to Serie C2.

In the 2010–11 season Voghera gained access to the Serie D promotion play-off advancing through the group stage to the semifinals, where it was eliminated by Rimini.

Liquidation and following refoundations 
In summer 2013 the club was not able to enter 2013–14 Serie D and was so subsequently liquidated.

A first attempt to re-start the activity took place in 2015, as three football clubs based in Voghera (Nord Voghera, Torrevillese and Orione) united in a new company called Associazione Sportiva Dilettantistica Voghera, which joined the Prima Categoria in 2015-2016 and was promoted to Promozione in 2017–2018. However, just one year later the club went again on bankruptcy and had to withdraw from the championship in winter 2018.

After some months, businessman Oreste Cavaliere took over A.S.D. OltrepòVoghera (another club based in Voghera, playing its football in Eccellenza), renaming it Associazione Sportiva Dilettantistica AVC Vogherese 1919 and re-starting the "rossoneri" history.

Colors and badge 
Its colors are red and black.

External links
Official website

 
Defunct football clubs in Italy
Football clubs in Lombardy
Voghera
1919 establishments in Italy
2013 disestablishments in Italy
Association football clubs established in 1919